The 1922 United States Senate election in Tennessee was held on November 7, 1922. Incumbent Democratic Senator Kenneth D. McKellar was re-elected to a second term in office, defeating Republican former interim Senator Newell Sanders.

General election

Candidates
Kenneth McKellar, incumbent Senator since 1917 (Democratic)
Newell Sanders, businessman and former interim U.S. Senator (1912–13) (Republican)

Results

See also
1922 United States Senate elections

References

1922
Tennessee
United States Senate